The Trois Conseillers is a summit in the French Pyrenees, culminating at .

Geography 
It is located in the Hautes-Pyrénées department in the Néouvielle massif, near Saint-Lary-Soulan in the Pyrenees National Park and the Néouvielle National Nature Reserve.

See also 
 List of Pyrenean three-thousanders

Mountains of the Pyrenees
Mountains of Hautes-Pyrénées
Pyrenean three-thousanders